ZIL or Zil may refer to:

 ZiL (Zavod imeni Likhachova), a former car and truck factory in Moscow, Russia
 ZiL lanes, dedicated traffic lanes for Soviet officials
 ZIL (Moscow Central Circle), a Moscow Metro railway station
 Zil, Iran, a village in Kerman Province
 Zil, Kurds, a Kurdish tribal federation
 Zills, also zils or finger cymbals, tiny cymbals used in belly dancing and similar performance
 Zork Implementation Language, used by the Z-machine
 ZFS Intent Log, where ZFS transactions are assembled before committing; see Oracle ZFS
 Land of Zill, a place in Felix the Cat: The Movie

See also
 Zimbabwe Institute of Legal Studies (ZILS)